Natan Slifkin (also Nosson Slifkin) (born 25 June 1975 in Manchester, England), popularly known as the "Zoo Rabbi," is a British-born Israeli Modern Orthodox community rabbi and the director of the Biblical Museum of Natural History in Beit Shemesh, Israel. Slifkin is best known for his interests in zoology, Judaism's relationship to evolution, Jewish and biblical history, and his writing (which is controversial among the Haredi community) on these topics.

Biography
Slifkin was born and raised in Manchester, United Kingdom, where he studied at a local yeshiva. He left in 1995 to continue his studies in the Medrash Shmuel yeshiva and Mir Yeshiva in Jerusalem, Israel. He was ordained at Ohr Somayach Institutions, where he taught Talmud and contemporary Judaism. He now lives with his family in Ramat Beit Shemesh, where he runs the Biblical Museum of Natural History. Slifkin has a master's degree in Judaic Studies from the Lander Institute in Jerusalem and a doctorate in Jewish History from Bar-Ilan University, completed in 2016.  His dissertation was entitled: Rabbinic and Maskilic Encounters with Zoology in the Nineteenth Century.

Science, zoology and Torah
Slifkin explores traditional rabbinic perspectives in his books and discusses how they may relate to issues of interest to modern science. Slifkin is the author of numerous books dealing with the intersection of Torah, science and zoology.

In Slifkin's approach to the reconciliation of Genesis and modern scientific theory, traditional Judaism mandates neither a literalistic approach to biblical cosmology, nor a belief that the Talmud is always correct about scientific matters.  Views similar to these were accepted by some as within the realm of Orthodox Judaism. A public debate triggered by Slifkin's books began regarding how literally Orthodox Judaism interprets the Torah and how much weight should be given to the scientific discussions of rabbinic sages.

Rabbinic ban
Slifkin's books, which had "cautious references to evolutionary theory", led to a denunciation of his work by ultra-Orthodox authorities. The rabbis object to the tone of Slifkin's work, stating that "even what is not heretical is expressed in a way only a heretic would speak." The ban sparked a debate, largely on the Internet, which led to Slifkin's publisher, Targum Press discontinuing distribution of his books. Yashar Books, a smaller Jewish publisher, agreed to distribute them.

Moment magazine quoted an anonymous rabbi who said: “The Slifkin ban is a huge break. It’s a kind of power struggle, and those who didn’t sign the ban are outraged right now. I’m talking about rabbis with long white beards who are furious about it...He’s saying out loud what a lot of people have been talking about quietly all along. To those people, he’s a kind of figurehead."

Rabbi Aharon Feldman and Rabbi Shlomo Miller wrote articles in defense of the ban, and Rabbi Moshe Meiselman gave three lectures on this topic at Toras Moshe, although Rabbi Feldman grants that, even in the opinion of Rabbi Eliashiv, Slifkin "cannot be called a heretic" even though parts of the books are, in their view, heretical, because "he did follow, at least, a minority opinion." These defenses of the ban were themselves controversial, and Rabbi Slifkin posted them all on his website, together with rebuttals written by various people. Rabbi Meiselman requested that Rabbi Slifkin remove the lectures from his website, a request to which Slifkin did not acquiesce. In 2013, Rabbi Meiselman released a nearly 900 page book entitled "Torah, Chazal, and Science", which he stated "was in response to some recent controversies surrounding issues of Torah and science. A spate of books... have attempted to introduce a radical new theology and proclaim it compatible with classic Jewish belief." Chaim Malinowitz broke with his Haredi colleagues in not seeking a ban on Slifkin's books.

On 5 October 2008 Slifkin published an essay entitled In Defense of My Opponents in which he acknowledges that there is a reasonable basis for a ban on his books in certain communities.

Published works
Slifkin is the author of numerous books on Torah and zoology:

The Science of Torah: The Reflection of Torah in the Laws of Science, The Creation of the Universe and the Development of Life (Targum Press 2001) . Later republished in a revised and expanded edition as The Challenge of Creation: Judaism's Encounter with Science, Cosmology and Evolution (Zoo Torah/Yashar Books 2006) 
Mysterious Creatures (Targum Press 2003) . Republished in a revised and expanded edition as Sacred Monsters: Mysterious and Mythical Creatures of Scripture, Talmud and Midrash (Zoo Torah/Yashar Books 2006) 
The Camel, the Hare and the Hyrax: A Study of the Laws of Animals with One Kosher Sign in Light of Modern Zoology (Targum Press 2004) . Republished with corrections in 2011.
Lying for Truth: Understanding Yaakov's Deception of Yitzchak (Targum Press 1998) 
 Second Focus: Original and Stimulating Essays on Jewish Thought (Targum Press 1999) 
In Noah's Footsteps: Biblical Perspectives on the Zoo (The Tisch Family Zoological Gardens 2000)
Nature's Song: An Elucidation of Perek Shirah, the Ancient Text that Lists the Philosophical and Ethical Lessons of the Natural World (Targum Press 2001) . Republished in 2009.
Man and Beast: Our Relationship with Animals in Jewish Law and Thought (Zoo Torah/Yashar Books 2006) 
The Torah Encyclopedia of the Animal Kingdom (Maggid 2015) 
Rationalism Vs. Mysticism: Schisms in Traditional Jewish Thought (Gefen 2021) 

Slifkin writes a blog called "Rationalist Judaism," in which he promulgates his opinions on Jewish thought. He has also published e-books on many of his topics of interest.

See also
 Jewish views on evolution
 Omphalos hypothesis

References

External links
 Zoo Torah - Slifkin's main project
 Rationalist Judaism - Slifkin's blog
 The Biblical Museum of Natural History

1975 births
Living people
Bar-Ilan University alumni
British emigrants to Israel
British Orthodox rabbis
Censorship in Judaism
Directors of museums in Israel
Israeli male writers
Israeli Orthodox rabbis
Judaism and science
Lander Institute alumni
People from Beit Shemesh
Rabbis of Ohr Somayach
Writers about religion and science
Writers from Manchester